Temple Emanu-El is a Synagogue centrally located in Palm Beach, Florida. It is a Conservative Jewish congregation founded in 1962.

References 

1962 establishments in Florida
Ashkenazi Jewish culture in Florida
Ashkenazi synagogues
Conservative synagogues in Florida
Jewish organizations established in 1962
Sephardi Jewish culture in the United States
Sephardi synagogues